Jose Antonio García Prieto (born 16 October 1964 in San Salvador, El Salvador) is a retired Salvadoran football player and current coach of Titán.

Playing career

Club
Nicknamed '''', Prieto played for Alianza in the first division, helping the club win the 1987-88 title.

Managerial career
After he retired, Prieto became a manager and currently is with Titán he has won two second division title with the,.

External links
  (resigning as assistant coach of FAS)

1964 births
Living people
Sportspeople from San Salvador
Association football defenders
Salvadoran footballers
Salvadoran football managers